Samuel Haugh (February 1, 1675 - June 9, 1717) was an early American silversmith, active in Boston. Only three of his works are known to survive: two cups and a spoon.

Haugh was born in Boston to Rev. Samuel Haugh and Ann Raynsford. Upon his father's untimely death in June, 1679, the diarist Samuel Sewall became his guardian. In 1690, he became apprentice to silversmith Thomas Savage, as recorded in an entry in Sewall's diary:

"Thorsday [sic], November the Sixth 1690, at my House in Boston Samuel Haugh and Mr. Thomas Savage mutually sign'd, seal'd and delivered Indentures to each other; Sam to serve him from 7th Octr last, Seven Years and Six Moneths [sic]. Witnesses, S.S. Joseph Wheeler, Jn. Cole, Thomas Banister."

After his apprenticeship, he married Margaret (Cowell) Johnson on September 30, 1697, in Boston, and there worked from 1697-1717 as a silversmith. In 1713 he served as second sargeant in the Artillery Company. An entry in the Sewall Papers records his burial:

"[1717, June] 9. Mr. Sam. Hough buried; Mr. Edwards, Ellis, Williams Retailer were 3 of the Bearers. I had a scarf. Mr Eliakim Hutchinson & I follow'd next after the Mourners, 42 upon the Coffin."

References 
 Diary of Samuel Sewall, Diary of Samuel Sewall: 1674-1729, Volume 1; Volume 5, Massachusetts Historical Society, 1878, page 333.
 Sewall Papers, Vol. III, page 132.
 New England Marriages Prior to 1700, Clarence Almon Torrey, Clarence Almon Torrey, Genealogical Publishing Com, 1985, page 391.
 "Samuel Haugh", Western Michigan Genealogical Society. (Appears to have incorrect date for death.)
 "Samuel Haugh", American Silversmiths.
 American Silversmiths and Their Marks: The Definitive (1948) Edition, Stephen G. C. Ensko, Courier Corporation, 2012, page 68.
 Colonial Silversmiths: Masters & Apprentices, Museum of Fine Arts, Boston, 1956.
 History of the Military Company of the Massachusetts, Now Called, the Ancient and Honorable Artillery Company of Massachusetts: 1637-1888, Volume 1, Oliver Ayer Roberts, A. Mudge & Son, 1895, page 376.
 American Church Silver of the Seventeenth and Eighteenth Centuries: With a Few Pieces of Domestic Plate, Exhibited at the Museum of Fine Arts, July to December, 1911, Museum of Fine Arts, Boston, 1911, page 143.
 "Lot 345: A RARE SILVER CUP", Invaluable, LLC.

American silversmiths
1675 births
1717 deaths